Pedda Chintakunta is a part of Allagadda Nagara Panchayati in Kurnool district of the Indian state of Andhra Pradesh. It is located 115 km from Kurnool. It is 1 km from Rayalaseema Express Highway.

Cities and towns in Kurnool district